Charles Berty (8 September 1911 – 18 April 1944) was a French racing cyclist. He rode in the 1935 Tour de France. As a routier and regional of the "Sud-Est" team, he finished the Tour de France three times (1935/36/39), while achieving a few top ten placings in the stages.

During World War II Berty was active in the French Resistance. He was arrested and was sent to the Mauthausen concentration camp to do forced labor. Suffering from the camp conditions and physical abuse, he died in the camp on 18 April 1944.

References

External links
 

1911 births
1944 deaths
French male cyclists
Sportspeople from Isère
French Resistance members
Resistance members who died in Nazi concentration camps
French people who died in Mauthausen concentration camp
Resistance members killed by Nazi Germany
Cyclists from Auvergne-Rhône-Alpes